Western Province is one of Rwanda's five provinces. It was created in early January 2006 as part of a government decentralization program that re-organized the country's local government structures.

Western Province comprises the former provinces of Cyangugu, Gisenyi, Kibuye, and a small portion of Ruhengeri. It is divided into the districts of Karongi, Nyabihu, Rubavu, Rusizi, Ngororero, Nyamasheke, and Rutsiro. The capital city of Western Province is Kibuye.

Notes and references

External links 
 

 
Provinces of Rwanda
Lake Kivu
States and territories established in 2006